Rajasthan Football Association (RFA). formerly the Rajputana Football Association and Ajmer and Mewar Football Association, is the state governing body for football in Rajasthan, India. It is affiliated with the All India Football Federation, the sport's national governing body.

History
The Rajasthan Football Association was founded as the Rajputana Football Association in 1934. The objective of RFA is to improve the standard of football in the Indian state of Rajasthan.

In 2016, after the RFA become operational after two decades of non-functioning, RFA has decided to revamp the Rajasthan Football System. The association started the first ever statewide football league in Rajasthan known as Rajasthan State Men's League which is a multi-divisional league from state-level to district levels. The association is also working to create new clubs, coaches and referees in the state to boost football.

Competitions

Men's
R-League A Division
 R-League Futsal

Women's 
 Rajasthan State Women's State Championship

Rajasthan football system
The Rajasthan football system consists of the national state league, R-League A Division, at the top, district leagues in second, followed by leagues within the leagues. This system is being planned to operate during the whole calendar year but at different times.

Clubs

 Ajmer FC
 Rajasthan Perfect FC 
 Rajasthan United FC
 Mewar FC
 Neerja Modi FA
 Playspace FC 
 Poornima Panthers
 Zinc Football
 RED DEVILS FC BHARATPUR

District associations

References

External links 
RFA Website
RFA Facebook Page

Football governing bodies in India
Football in Rajasthan
Organisations based in Jaipur
1934 establishments in India
Sports organizations established in 1934